The 2014 Challenger Banque Nationale de Granby was a professional tennis tournament played on outdoor hard courts. It was the 21st edition, for men, and 4th edition, for women, of the tournament and part of the 2014 ATP Challenger Tour and the 2014 ITF Women's Circuit, offering totals of $50,000, for men, and $25,000, for women, in prize money. It took place in Granby, Quebec, Canada between July 14 and July 20, 2014.

Men's singles main-draw entrants

Seeds

1 Rankings are as of July 7, 2014

Other entrants
The following players received wildcards into the singles main draw:
 Érik Chvojka
 Isade Juneau
 Tommy Mylnikov
 Brayden Schnur

The following players received entry from the qualifying draw:
 Gonzalo Escobar
 Jordan Kerr
 Pavel Krainik
 Osama Zoghlami

Champions

Men's singles

 Hiroki Moriya def.  Fabrice Martin, 7–5, 6–7(4–7), 6–3

Women's singles

 Miharu Imanishi def.  Stéphanie Foretz, 6–4, 6–4

Men's doubles

 Marcus Daniell /  Artem Sitak def.  Jordan Kerr /  Fabrice Martin, 7–6(7–5), 5–7, [10–5]

Women's doubles

 Hiroko Kuwata /  Riko Sawayanagi def.  Erin Routliffe /  Carol Zhao by walkover

External links
Official website

Challenger Banque Nationale de Granby
Challenger Banque Nationale de Granby
Challenger de Granby
Challenger Banque Nationale de Granby
Challenger Banque Nationale de Granby